John Benedict Hillerman (December 20, 1932 – November 9, 2017) was an American actor best known for his starring role as Jonathan Quayle Higgins III on the television series Magnum, P.I. that aired from 1980 to 1988. For his role as Higgins, Hillerman earned five Golden Globe nominations, winning in 1981, and four Emmy nominations, winning in 1987. He retired from acting in 1999.

Early life and career
Hillerman was born in Denison, Texas, the son of Christopher Benedict Hillerman, a gas station owner, and Lenora Joan (née Medlinger). He was the middle child with two sisters. His father was the grandson of immigrants from Germany and Holland, and his mother the daughter of immigrants from Austria and Germany. Hillerman developed an interest in opera at the age of ten, and traveled to Dallas to watch Metropolitan Opera productions. He attended St. Xavier's Academy, and after graduation, he attended the University of Texas at Austin for three years, majoring in journalism.

Hillerman served four years in the United States Air Force (1953-1957), working in maintenance in a B-36 wing of the Strategic Air Command, and achieving the rank of Staff Sergeant. He became interested in acting after working with a theatrical group in Fort Worth during his service: "I was bored with barracks life. I got into [acting] to meet people in town. A light went on." After his 1957 discharge, he moved to New York City to study at the American Theatre Wing, and performed in professional theater for the next twelve years, in productions such as Henry IV, Part 2 and The Great God Brown. Despite over 100 stage roles, Hillerman was unable to make a living as a stage actor, and he moved to Hollywood in 1969.

Career

Film 
Hillerman made his film debut in They Call Me Mister Tibbs! (1970) in an uncredited role as a reporter. Director Peter Bogdanovich, with whom Hillerman had previously worked during his stage career, cast Hillerman in his films The Last Picture Show, What's Up, Doc?, and Paper Moon. Hillerman worked steadily thereafter in motion pictures and television through the 1970s, including notable supporting roles in the 1974 films Chinatown and Blazing Saddles. After being cast in Magnum, P.I., he shot only four additional pictures between 1980 and 1996, with his final film performance coming in A Very Brady Sequel.

Television 

In 1975, Hillerman was a co-star in Ellery Queen as Simon Brimmer, a radio detective who hosted a radio show and tried to outsmart the title character (Jim Hutton). From 1976 to 1980, he had a recurring role as Mr. Conners on the sitcom One Day at a Time, and he co-starred as Betty White's estranged husband on The Betty White Show (1977–1978). He appeared in season 2, episode 4 of Wonder Woman as a Nazi spy. In 1978, Hillerman also appeared in an episode of Little House on the Prairie called "Harriet's Happenings". In 1979, Hillerman performed on a television pilot for an American version of the British situation comedy Are You Being Served?, Beanes of Boston, as Mr. John Peacock, an American translation of the original British character, Captain Peacock.

He is perhaps best remembered for his role as former British Army Sergeant Major Jonathan Higgins in Magnum, P.I. (1980–1988). He learned to speak in the character's educated middle/upper class English accent, known as Received Pronunciation or the King's/Queen's English, by listening to a recording of Laurence Olivier reciting Hamlet. He considered Higgins his favorite role, and described the character in a 1988 interview as "think[ing] he's the only sane character [in the show], and everyone else is stark raving mad." Hillerman recalled in 1984 that he was up for a role in the 1980 Buck Henry/Bob Newhart film First Family and "wanted the part very badly," and had he gotten the role, he would have turned down the role of Higgins.

In 1982, Hillerman starred in the television pilot of Tales of the Gold Monkey, as a German villain named Fritz the Monocle. He hosted the 1984 David Hemmings-directed puzzle video Money Hunt: The Mystery of the Missing Link. In 1990, Hillerman returned to television as Lloyd Hogan in the sixth and final season of the sitcom The Hogan Family. That same year, he portrayed Dr. Watson to Edward Woodward's Sherlock Holmes in Hands of a Murderer.

In 1993, he appeared in Berlin Break for one season. He played the role of Mac MacKenzie, a former spy and currently the proprietor of Mac's, a bar in West Berlin considered to be neutral territory during the Cold War. Mac teamed up with two jobless spies as investigators: Valentin Renko (Nicholas Clay), an ex-KGB agent, and Willy Richter (Kai Wulff), an ex-BND (West German secret service) operative. The show reunited him with Jeff MacKay, who portrayed "Mac" MacReynolds in Magnum P.I..

Later years and death 
In the late 1980s, Hillerman was commissioned into the Royal Colonial Light Horse Brigade (RCLHB) as a full Colonel of Cavalry. The RCLHB, located in Springfield, Missouri, continues to maintain its role as an active troupe of historians and military enthusiasts commemorating events that never happened and glories never known.
After Hillerman retired from acting in 1999, he returned to his home state of Texas. On November 9, 2017, he died of cardiovascular disease at his Houston home, at the age of 84.

Filmography
Sources:

Film

Television

Awards and nominations

Notes

References

External links

 
 
 
 
 John Hillerman — Aveleyman

1932 births
2017 deaths
20th-century American male actors
American male film actors
American male stage actors
American male television actors
American people of Austrian descent
American people of Dutch descent
American people of German descent
Male actors from Texas
Military personnel from Texas
Moody College of Communication alumni
Outstanding Performance by a Supporting Actor in a Drama Series Primetime Emmy Award winners
Best Supporting Actor Golden Globe (television) winners
People from Denison, Texas
United States Air Force airmen